Kemble railway station is a railway station that serves the village of Kemble in Gloucestershire, England. Despite its rural location, Kemble station has a high number of passengers, due mainly to the proximity of Cirencester.

History
The station was opened by the Great Western Railway (GWR) as an exchange station on 12 May 1845 with the line opening from Swindon to Gloucester. Only on 1 May 1882 did it become a public station replacing the nearby .

The distance between the platforms and the large clearance between the remaining running lines is a legacy from when Kemble first opened because it originally accommodated Brunel's  broad gauge tracks. These were changed to standard gauge tracks in 1892.

Both the Tetbury branch line and the Cirencester Branch Line were closed to traffic under The Reshaping of British Railways, the first day without service being 6 April 1964.

British Rail reduced the line to Swindon to single track in 1968 but the second track was reinstated in 2014.

Stationmasters

Jeremiah Greenaway ca. 1869 – 1900
John William Boyd 1900 - 1922 (formerly station master at Tetbury)
G. Evans 1922 – 1929 (formerly station master at Purton)
M.E. Waters until 1935 (also station master at Cirencester Town, afterwards station master at Cirencester Town)
C. Feldwick. 1935 – 1942 (afterwards station master at Cirencester Town)
Walter John Butt Watts from 1942 (formerly station master at Brimscombe)

Description
The station has two platforms in use.  The former Tetbury bound platform remains but the track has been lifted. The building on the down platform (no. 2) has been out of use for several years, containing toilets and a waiting room, which are still in situ. On the former Cirencester platform, a short stub of track remains for the occasional stabling of track machines. This ends at a buffer stop just before the station car park. In 2013, Cotswold District Council refused an application by Network Rail to demolish part of the Grade II listed Cirencester bay platform in connection with the redoubling of the line from Swindon. According to the Council, the platform was still in a good state of repair and any public benefit from the demolition would not outweigh the damage that would be caused to the historical significance of the station. The station has a ticket office and a small café. The limestone bridge, at the south end of the station, was Grade II listed from 5 November 2015 and the station and water tank from 27 February 1986.

Services
Great Western Railway operate all services at Kemble using mainly Class 800 bi-mode trains.

The typical off-peak service in trains per hour is:
 1 tph to London Paddington
 1 tph to  via 

There is also a limited service to/from  via the Wessex Main Line.

References

External links

 History of the line
 Gloucestershire Transport
 

Railway stations in Gloucestershire
DfT Category D stations
Railway stations in Great Britain opened in 1882
Former Great Western Railway stations
Railway stations served by Great Western Railway
Grade II listed buildings in Gloucestershire
Grade II listed railway stations
Kemble, Gloucestershire